James Johnston (16 September 1866 – 10 February 1952) was a Scottish footballer who played as a centre half and wing half.

Career
Johnston played club football for Abercorn between 1885 and 1891. He made several representative appearances for Renfrewshire while with the Paisley club in that period, and also played for them in the inaugural season of the Scottish Football League in 1890–91 – they also reached the semi-finals of the Scottish Cup that year.

Johnston made one appearance for Scotland in 1888. He emigrated permanently to the United States around 1892 and played for local clubs there.

References

1866 births
1952 deaths
Footballers from Renfrewshire
People from Johnstone
Scottish footballers
Scotland international footballers
Johnstone F.C. players
Abercorn F.C. players
Association football defenders
Association football wing halves
Scottish emigrants to the United States